Maria Kirilenko was the defending champion, but did not compete in the juniors that year.

Kirsten Flipkens won the tournament, defeating Michaëlla Krajicek in the final, 6–3, 7–5.

Seeds

Draw

Finals

Top half

Section 1

Section 2

Bottom half

Section 3

Section 4

Sources
Draw

Girl's Singles
US Open, 2003 Girls' Singles